Manasa Vacha Karmana is a 1979 Indian Malayalam film,  directed by I. V. Sasi and produced by P. V. Gangadharan. The film stars Jayabharathi, Sukumaran, M. G. Soman and Seema in the lead roles and was scored by A. T. Ummer. The film has art direction by Kalalayam Ravi.

Cast
Jayabharathi as Sumithra
Sukumaran as Sukumaran
M. G. Soman as Dr.Venugopal
Seema  as Geetha
Sathar as Menon
Sankaradi as Geetha's father
Nellikodu Bhaskaran as Parameshwaran Pilla
Cochin Haneefa as Rameshan
Latha as Lathika Menon
Kunjandi as Geetha's uncle
K. T. C. Abdulla as Rameshan's friend

Soundtrack
The music was composed by A. T. Ummer and the lyrics were written by Bichu Thirumala.

See also
 Manasa, vacha, karmana

References

External links
 

1979 films
1970s Malayalam-language films
Films directed by I. V. Sasi